41 Ophiuchi is a binary star system in the zodiac constellation of Ophiuchus, and is positioned less than half a degree to the south of the celestial equator. It is visible to the naked eye as a faint, orange-hued point of light with a combined apparent visual magnitude of 4.72. The distance to this system is approximately 202 light years based on parallax.

This is a visual binary with an orbital period of 141 years and an eccentricity of 0.866. The magnitude 4.92 primary, designated component A, is an aging K-type giant star with a stellar classification of K2III. It is a red clump giant, which indicates it is on the horizontal branch and is generating energy through helium fusion at its core. The star is 3.7 billion years old with 1.46 times the mass of the Sun and has expanded to nearly 12 times the Sun's radius. It is radiating 60 times the Sun's luminosity from its swollen photosphere at an effective temperature of 4,509 K.

References

K-type giants
Horizontal-branch stars
Binary stars
Ophiuchus (constellation)
BD-00 3255
Ophiuchi, 41
156266
084514
6415